Look at Life may refer to:
Look at Life (film series), British cinema series produced by the Rank Organisation during the 1960s
Look at Life (film), student film by George Lucas
Looks at Life, 1967 album by John Hartford